General Deverell may refer to:

Christopher Deverell (fl. 1970s–2020s), British Army general
Cyril Deverell (1874–1947), British Army general
Jack Deverell (born 1945), British Army general